Z. D. Ramsdell House, also known as The Ramsdell House, is a historic home located at Ceredo, Wayne County, West Virginia, atop a mound claimed to be an Indian burial mound. It was built in 1857–1858, and is a two-story red brick and frame dwelling measuring 30 feet wide and 48 feet deep.  It sits on a stone foundation and is in the Greek Revival-style with a gable roof. Zophar D. Ramsdell came to Ceredo at the invitation of the town's founder, and fellow abolitionist, Eli Thayer.  He built a shoe and boot factory, served as a Captain and Quartermaster during the American Civil War, served as a postmaster after the war, and served as a legislative representative in the West Virginia State Senate during 1868 and 1869.   The home is believed to be one of the last stops of The Underground Railroad before crossing the Ohio River to freedom.  It is open as a historic house museum.

It was listed on the National Register of Historic Places in 1983.

References

External links
West Virginia Department of Commerce: Z. D. Ramsdell House
Ramsdell House Website

Historic house museums in West Virginia
Houses on the National Register of Historic Places in West Virginia
Greek Revival houses in West Virginia
Houses completed in 1857
Houses in Wayne County, West Virginia
Museums in Wayne County, West Virginia
National Register of Historic Places in Wayne County, West Virginia
Mounds in West Virginia
Archaeological sites in West Virginia
1857 establishments in Virginia